Hodoul Island is an uninhabited island in Seychelles, lying in the center of the Victoria port.
The island belongs to the Mahe Port Islands, which are mostly artificial islands created by funds from Dubai when the Dubai dredger was placed in Seychelles.

History
The island was named after the corsair Jean-François Hodoul. In 1875, Dr. Henry Brooks of Seychelles rented it to store coal. He kept about 2,000 tons of coal there until 1940.

During 1995–2005, Hodoul Island served as a storage site for explosives for the Mahe port reclamation project.

In 2016, a new casino was opened on the west point of the island.

Administration
The island belongs to English River District.

Facilities
The island has a 500 m2 guesthouse on the east point, and a 600 m2 casino on the west point.

Image gallery

References

External links 

 info
 Mahe Map 2015
 info on the island

Islands of Mahé Islands
Uninhabited islands of Seychelles